Michael Oliver Johnson (born 1947) is a New Zealand author and creative writing teacher. He has written thirteen novels, eleven books of poetry, several short stories featured in critically acclaimed anthologies, and three children's books. Johnson has been awarded two literary fellowships in New Zealand, one with the University of Canterbury, and one with the University of Auckland. His novel Dumb Show won the Buckland Memorial Literary Award for fiction in 1997. He is also a founder of Lasavia Publishing Ltd, a publishing house created in Waiheke Island, New Zealand.

Johnson's prose contains elements of magic realism and science fiction.

Early life
Johnson grew up in Hinds, a small, rural town about 12 miles south of Ashburton, New Zealand. The rugged, sparsely populated landscape of his childhood is a feature in his novel Dumb Show. He attended the University of Canterbury, earning a degree in Political Science in 1971. He travelled around Europe and North Africa before returning to New Zealand in the late 1970s, when he began to focus on his writing.

Career
Johnson's writing career was launched with his first book of poetry, The Palanquin Ropes, which co-won the John Cowie Reid Memorial Competition in 1981. This prestigious literary award has been won by writers such as Alistair Paterson and Cilla McQueen. In 1986, Johnson's first novel, Lear – The Shakespeare Company Plays Lear at Babylon, was shortlisted for the New Zealand Book Awards.

Johnson has been the recipient of a number of awards and creative writing grants from 1985 to 2002. To date, he has written eight novels, two collections of shorter fiction, one non-fiction, one children's title and six poetry collections, in addition to having various works selected for literary anthologies.

Mike Johnson's teaching career spans over twenty years. Since the late 80s, he has taught creative writing in a variety of institutions and circumstances, at both undergraduate and graduate level. From 2008 to 2020, he taught a Master of Creative Writing course at the Auckland University of Technology (AUT). In addition, he is involved in a publishing company, Lasavia Publishing Ltd, in partnership with his wife, Leila Lees.

Critical reception
Because of its mixed genre nature, Johnson's work is not considered a part of mainstream New Zealand literature. His novels and poetry have, however, received a positive response from the critics.

Dr David Dowling, writing in the prestigious Landfall magazine on Johnson's first novel, Lear, comments: ‘Johnson makes an original contribution to the literature of disaster, and certainly to the nation's literature that still struggles beneath the mantle of social realism; he does it by the sheer intensity of his poetic vision, combined with an adroit metafictional sense ... In this fallen world, does falling matter? Johnson’s novel is an exuberant, artful meditation on this question.’

Commenting on his 2011 novel, Travesty, Jodie Dalgleish writes, ‘(Johnson) has achieved a kind of ‘worldmaking’ [...] that confirms his position as one of New Zealand's most important fiction writers.'

Siobhan Harvey, prominent poet and critic, writes about Johnson's last book of poetry, To Beatrice Where We Cross the Line, 'A skilled practitioner at whatever literary craft he turns his hand to...Johnson is a writer at one with the word, its power, its airy finesses and everyday solidities, its resourcefulness, its craft.'

Writing in the New Zealand Herald on Johnson's critically well-received English to English translations of the Dang Dynasty poet, Li He (The Vertical Harp – the selected poems of Li He) writer and critic Iain Sharp wrote: ‘Mike Johnson is the most underrated of all living New Zealand authors. Sometimes gothic, sometimes lyrical, sometimes both at once, his output over the past three decades has been extraordinary. Yet much of his fiction and most of his poetry has slipped by, barely reviewed...'

Following the successful reception of his dystopian fiction novel Driftdead, in December 2021, Johnson was featured in North & South Magazine. Paul Little described the book as, 'a door-stopping piece of dystopian fiction whose large and colourful cast includes the zombie-like driftdead of the title.'

Well known, contemporary writer, Witi Ihimaera, has described Johnson as 'One of the most innovative, original and fearless writers I know.'

Literary works

Novels

 Lear: The Shakespeare Company Plays Lear at Babylon, Hard Echo Press, Auckland, 1986 
 Antibody Positive, Hard Echo Press, Auckland, 1986 
 Foreigners: Three Novellas, Penguin Books: Auckland, 1991 
 Lethal Dose, Hard Echo Press: Auckland, 1991 
 Dumb Show, Longacre Press: Dunedin, 1996 
 Counterpart, Harper Collins: Sydney, 2001 
 Stench, Hazard Press: Christchurch, 2004 
 Travesty, Titus Books: Auckland, 2010 (reprinted 2016) 
 Hold my Teeth While I Teach you to Dance, Lasavia Publishing Ltd: Auckland, 2014
Back in the Day, Lasavia Publishing Ltd: Auckland, 2015
Confessions of a Cockroach and Headstone, two novellas published together, Lasavia Publishing Ltd: Auckland, 2017
Zombie in a Spacesuit, Lasavia Publishing Ltd: Auckland, 2018
Driftdead, Lasavia Publishing Ltd: Auckland, 2020

Poetry
 The Palanquin Ropes, Voice Press: Wellington, 1983
 From a Woman in Mt Eden Prison & Drawing Lessons, Hard Echo Press: Auckland, 1984
 Standing Wave. Hard Echo Press: Auckland, 1985
 Mary Mouse, Manuscript of Children’s Poetry, broadcast on Radio New Zealand national radio, 1991
 Treasure Hunt, Auckland University Press: Auckland, 1996
 The Vertical Harp: selected poems of Li He, Titus Books: Auckland, 2007
 To Beatrice Where We Crossed The Line, Second Avenue Press: Auckland, 2014
Two Lines and a Garden, with Leila Lees. Lasavia Publishing Ltd: Auckland, 2017
Ladder with No Rungs, with Leila Lees. Lasavia Publishing Ltd: Auckland, 2019
The Toy Box, Part One of "The Raising Light Trilogy", Lasavia Publishing Ltd: Auckland, 2020
Hide Your Eyes: The Rumi Poems, Part Two of "The Raising Light Trilogy", Lasavia Publishing Ltd: Auckland, 2020
Extinction Rebellion, Part Three of "The Raising Light Trilogy", Lasavia Publishing Ltd: Auckland, 2020

Children's

 Taniwha, Illustrated by Jennifer Rackham, Lasavia Publishing, first published in 2015 with a bilingual Te Reo (Maori) edition released in 2016
 Kenny and the Roof Slide, illustrated by Jennifer Rackham, Lasavia Publishing, 2018
 Flippity Fluppity Flop, illustrated by Leila Lees, Lasavia Publishing, 2021

Non-fiction
 Dialogue, A text for senior English, Co-author with A.T. Johnson, Whitcombe and Tombs: Christchurch 1973
 The Angel of Compassion, Lasavia Publishing Ltd: Auckland, 2014

Anthologised poetry
 The New Poets, Initiatives in New Zealand Poetry, Murray Edmond & Mary Paul (Editors), Allen & Unwin NZ Limited/Port Nicholson Press, 1987
 Essential New Zealand Poems, Siobhan Harvey, Harry Ricketts and James Norcliffe (Editors), Penguin, 2014

Anthologised short stories
 'The Woman of Tuscany House', Erotic Writing, Edited by Sue McCauley and Richard Mc Lachlan, Penguin: 1992
 ‘The Harmony of the Swine’, Tart and Juicy, Edited by Michael Gifkins, Vintage: 1994
 ‘Rutherford’s Dream’, Rutherford’s Dreams, Edited by Warwick Bennett and Patrick Hudson, IPL: 1995
 ‘When That Shark Bites’, Men Love Sex, Edited by Alan Close, Vintage: Australia, 1995
 ‘Teledildonics’, Lust, Edited by Michael Gifkins, Vintage: 1995
 ‘The Fohn Effect’, Antipodean Tales, Edited by Geoff Churchman, IPL: 1996
 ‘Towards the bottom of the garden, the plum blossom shows pink’, One hundred Short Short Stories, Edited by Graeme Lay, Tandem: 1998
 'Frames', Nine New Zealand Novellas, Peter Simpson, Reed Publishing (NZ) Ltd, 2005
 'The Wedding of Psyche', The myth of the 21st Century, Edited by Tina Shaw and Jack Ross, Reed Publishing: 2006
 'A visit to Te Wharau Bay: A Conversation at the End of the World’, The Best New Zealand Fiction # 6, Edited by Owen Marshall, Random House: 2009
'The Coming of the Gray Ghost', Scorchers, Edited by Paul Mountfort, Eunoia Press, 2021

Awards and honours
 1981 – Co winner of the John Cowie Reid Memorial Competition for a long poem or sequence of poems, with The Palanquin Ropes
 1982 – Poetry Prize: Te Awamutu Festival of the Arts
 1986 – Lear – The Shakespeare Company Plays Lear At Babylon shortlisted for New Zealand Book Awards
 1987 – University of Canterbury Literary Fellowship (Writer in Residence)
 1997 – Buckland Memorial Literary Award for the novel Dumb Show
 1999 – Francis Keane Award for best short story, Magic Strings'’
 2002 – University of Auckland Literary Fellowship
 2002 – Nominated for the Sir Julius Vogel Award for the novel Counterpart 2006 – Wellington composer Carol Shortis wins the Philip Neil Memorial Prize with a song entitled 'The riddle of her flight' with the lyrics of a poem from Mike Johnson's book Treasure Hunt''

References

New Zealand fantasy writers
University of Canterbury alumni
1947 births
Living people
New Zealand educators
New Zealand poets